Beer in South Africa has a long history, with a corporate history dating back to the early 20th century.

History 
South African beer has had two main influences on its development.  Firstly, European settlers who colonised the country brought expertise and know-how as the country was populated.  Dutch immigrants from the 1650s onwards, and British, immigrants during the 19th and 20th centuries both contributed in different ways to the knowledge of alcohol production.

South African Western Beer

Beer reached South Africa with its first white settlers and it has been brewed here for over 300 years.
On October 4, 1658, Jan van Riebeeck recorded in his diary that on this day the first beer was brewed at the Cape. High priority was given to the production of beer because it was an essential beverage for combating the dreaded scurvy so prevalent on ships engaged in the trade between the Netherlands and the East Indies. Beer is today still held in high regard as a wholesome natural beverage. In 1960 the Malan Liquor Commission completed its intensive investigations into the distribution of intoxicating liquor in South Africa and reported as follows:
“The thought of the Commission underlying this report is that conditions should be created which would encourage the consumption of natural alcoholic beverages, preferably in conjunction with food, at the expense of stronger liquor or spirits. Greater differences in price between natural beverages and spirits and the easy availability of the former are recommended as part of the scheme aimed at diverting the drinking habits of the people in this direction." Dr. E. M. Jellinck, who was regarded as the world’s leading research scientist in the field of alcohol studies, came to the following conclusion: “The type of beverage used is always revealing of drinking habits. Beer is a beverage selected, not by inebriates, but mainly by moderate users of alcohol.”

Another important but often overlooked influence has been indigenous knowledge.  Local breweries, operated by the black population, especially groups such as the Sotho, Zulu and Xhosa, have been brewing forms of sorghum beers long before any Europeans arrived.

Umqombothi, from the Nguni languages (Xhosa and Zulu), is a traditional beer made in the Transkei, from maize (corn), maize malt, sorghum malt, yeast, and water.

Bantu beer

The brewing and consumption of Bantu beer played an important role in Bantu tribal life in Southern Africa. It is traditionally brewed by allowing a mixture of water and malted sorghum to ferment. The fermented product is only partially strained and thus retains a considerable percentage of solid matter. It is looked upon as both a food and a drink.
In recent years commercially produced Bantu beer powders have been replacing sorghum malt in home brewing and at smaller industrial breweries. Most municipalities enjoyed a monopoly for the production of Bantu beer in their areas and the larger ones operated modern industrial plants for this purpose. In the industrial production of Bantu beer, maize grits became the major basic ingredient and were mixed with sorghum malt in a ratio of two to three parts of maize to one part of malt. Although most of the industrially produced Bantu beer is still sold from bulk, modern packaging in plastic and other types of containers was rapidly being introduced at most municipal breweries.
Since the supply of European liquor to the Bantu was legalised in 1962, the sale of Bantu beer by municipalities started to increase at a faster rate than before.

European and Bantu beer have much in common. The latter is in fact virtually the primitive forerunner of the former. In Leipzig, in Germany, a centuries-old brewery is preserved as a tourist attraction and its product is hard to distinguish from Bantu beer. It is not generally known that the nutritional value of European beer closely approximates that of Bantu beer. Both contain about the same percentage of alcohol but whereas fermentation is terminated in the case of European beer by pasteurisation after bottling, it continues with Bantu beer until it turns ‘sour’. Resultantly the alcoholic content of Bantu beer increases after it leaves the brewery and it is not unusual to find that it contains more alcohol than that permitted by law, namely, 3% by weight or nearly 4% by volume. Permitted by South African law of 1964 at that time.

Now, back in the 1960s, the South African Government decided to use the profits that accrue to municipalities from the production and sale of Bantu beer to plough back for the benefit of the Bantu communities in their respective areas, why the Apartheid Government built schools, libraries, clinics, four-room houses for Natives of the land, and succeeded to remove all African communities from their Townhomes e.g. Old Alberton North (Emagogogweni area) to townships e.g Katlehong, Thokoza, and Vosloorus areas (Katorus), far away from the European communities. They built all that using the Bantu Beer profits.

Bantu beer was produced at a cost of approximately 8 to 10 cents per gallon and sold from bulk at about 20 cents leaving municipalities with a gross profit in the vicinity of 10 to 12 cents per gallon, of which 2 cents accrue to the Central Government as excise duty.
When a gallon of European beer is sold through a municipal outlet for consumption on the premises the following amounts accrue to:
(а) the State (as excise duty) - 80 cents; and
(б) the Municipality (as a gross mark-up on sale) - 83 cents.
Municipalities were required to pay 80% of their net profit on the sale of European liquor to the Department of Bantu Administration for use in the development of Bantu homelands. From the purely fiscal angle, there would appear to be a strong case for encouraging the Bantu to drink more European beer because in so doing larger amounts will become available for its own and the country’s general benefit.

Modern day 
South Africa accounts for 34% of Africa's formal beer market and is expected to grow by 8–10% annually over the next five years. Beer consumption in the country was pegged at 60 litres per capita in 2012 which is greater than the 14.6-litre African average as well as the global average of 22 litres.

Today, South African Breweries (SAB) controls the vast majority of the South African beer market, and with the notable exception of imported brands such as Heineken, Guinness and others, SAB owns and produces all the major brands in the country, as well as owning Miller's Genuine Draft (American) and long list of others which makes it the world's second largest brewery. Their most popular and valuable brand is Carling Black Label, which is the most awarded beer in the country with 20 prestigious international beer awards to its name. They also produce Castle milk stout, Hansa Pilsner, Castle Lager and Castle Lite. Other commonly drunk beers in South Africa is Windhoek Lager, a beer from Namibia made according to the Reinheitsgebot, as well as Tafel Lager, another Namibian import.

Jo'burg beer, an independent business and low-priced beverage, is dominant among lower-income groups, and incorporates the tastes of traditional brewing.

Recent developments have seen an increase in South African Beer Tourism initiatives. Originally initiated by Beer Route, a collaboration of craft breweries in South Africa, other players have since come on board to help guide tourists to taprooms throughout the country. Around the same time Kwazulu-Natal also had a local guided product named KZN Craft Revolution. Beer Tourism is a rapidly growing tourism sector, closely related in concept to Culinary tourism and is very similar to the concept of a Wine route.

Microbreweries
A number of smaller microbreweries have sprung up in the past decades, and these tend to compete regionally.  The country's first microbrewery was Mitchell's Brewery in Knysna. Mitchell's is now produced as a contract brand with Devil's Peak Brewing Company. As of 2019, there were 211 microbreweries producing 34 million litres of craft beer annually. Other microbreweries in South Africa include:

Western Cape
The Western Cape province accounts for half of the beer microbreweries in South Africa.

Cape Town
 Afro Caribbean Brewing Co
 Aegir Project Independent Brewery
 Woodstock Brewery
 Ukhamba Brewery
 Boston Breweries
 Devils Peak Brewing Company
 Drifter Brewing Co.
 Jack Black
 Hopman Brewery
 Long Beach Brewery
 Red Sky Brew
 Shackleton Brewing Company
 Triggerfish Brewing
 Woodstock Brewery

Cape Winelands
 Birkenhead Brewery
 Cape Brewing Company
 Darling Brew
 Hermanus Brewing Co
 Hey Joe Brewing Co
 Honingklip 
 Frasers Folly
 Stellenbosch Brewing Company
 Old Potter's Inn
 Saggy Stone Brewing Company

Eastern Cape
 Emerald Vale Brewing Company, Chintsa, Eastern Cape
 Little Brewery in Port Alfred, Eastern Cape
 Bridge Street Brewery in Port Elizabeth Eastern Cape
 Richmond Hill Brewing Co
 Table 58 Brewing Co

KwaZulu-Natal
 Clockwork Brewhouse
 East Coast Brewing Co.
 Happy Days Brewery
 Nottingham Rd Brewing Company
 Shongweni Brewery
 That Brewing Co
 1000 Hills Brewing Co.
 Mzelemu brewery

Gauteng and North West

 SMACK! Republic Brewing Co.
 Drayman's Brewery
 Gilroy’s Brewery
 De Garve Brewery
 Copperlake Breweries
 Black Horse Brewery
 Mogallywood
 The Cockpit Brewhouse
 Humanbrew (Loxton Lager)
 Leaky Tap Brewery
 The RedRock Brewing Company
 Legends Brewery
 Hazeldean Brewing Co
 Mad Giant
 Frontier Beer Co
 Agar's Brewery
 Brewhogs Microbrewery
 Irish Ale House
 Brauhaus Afrika, Rustenburg, North West Province
 Copperlake Brewery

Free State, Limpopo and Mpumalanga
 Anvil Ale
 Clarens Brewery
 Dog and Fig Brewery
 Hops Hollow
 Stellar Brewery (Bloemfontein, Free State)
 Zwakala Brewery, Haenertsburg, Limpopo

Homebrewing culture
There is a fairly large homebrewing community in the major metropolitan cities throughout the country. Homebrewers meet on a monthly basis in major cities including Cape Town, Johannesburg, Port Elizabeth, Durban and Bloemfontein. The main clubs are the Wort Hogs (Gauteng), Southyeasters (Cape Town), Durban Homebrewers (Durban), Free State Fermenters (Bloemfontein) and the Helderberg Homebrew Club in Somerset West.

There are numerous national competitions held yearly. 2022 saw the inaugural bevPLUS Fools National Club Championship held at Fools and Fans 5 in the little town of Greyton in the Western Cape. Clubs from across the country competed against each other in an official BJCP competition to be crowned the best club in the country. Helderberg Homebrew Club took home the trophy for their excellent interpretation of the classic style; an English IPA.

Other notable competitions are: Nationals, Powwow, Fools National Club Championship, as well as various clubs hold league competitions.

See also

 Beer and breweries by region

References

Publisher: Historical Papers Research Archive, University of the Witwatersrand, Johannesburg, South Africa
Location: Johannesburg
©2016

External links
 Beer Route - find a comprehensive list of South Africa's Craft Beer Taprooms
 KZN Craft Revolution
 Ratebeer.com's 'Finding the Hidden Breweries in South Africa'
 Specialised Dispense Systems | Beer Draft Equipment Suppliers
 

 
Beer
South African alcoholic drinks